Wazir Ali (born 15 February 1928 – 20 December 1999) was a Pakistani cyclist. He competed in the individual road race and the time trial events at the 1948 Summer Olympics.

References

External links
 

1928 births
1999 deaths
Pakistani male cyclists
Olympic cyclists of Pakistan
Cyclists at the 1948 Summer Olympics
Place of birth missing